The 1951 Portuguese presidential election was held on 22 July, five years earlier than scheduled due to the death of President Óscar Carmona on 18 April 1951. 

Francisco Craveiro Lopes won the election unopposed after Manuel Quintão Meireles withdrew, while Rui Luís Gomes was removed from the ballot after being declared a communist by the Salazar dictatorship.

Results

Notes and references

See also
 President of Portugal
 Portugal
 Politics of Portugal

1951
Portugal
1951 elections in Portugal
July 1951 events in Europe
Single-candidate elections